1999 Elections to East Renfrewshire Council were held on 6 May 1999, the same day as the other Scottish local government elections and the Scottish Parliament election. The council remained under no overall control.

Aggregate results

ward results

References

1999 Scottish local elections
1999